Rashed Mosharraf (died 10 November 2011) was a Bangladesh Awami League politician and a Jatiya Sangsad member representing the Jamalpur-2 constituency. He served as the state minister of land during 1996–2001. He was also the president of Bangladesh Krishak League.

Career
Mosharraf served as the president of Bangladesh Krishak League and six terms in Parliament. He served as the State Minister of Land in the First Sheikh Hasina Cabinet. He served as the chairman of Janapath Housing Limited.

Personal life
Mosharraf's elder brother, Khaled Mosharraf, served as a sector commander of the Mukti Bahini in the Bangladesh Liberation war. He and his mother organized a rally in support of the 3 November 1975 Bangladesh coup d'état launched by Khaled.

Death
Mosharraf died on 10 November 2011, aged 74.

References

1930s births
2011 deaths
People from Jamalpur District
Mukti Bahini personnel
Awami League politicians
1st Jatiya Sangsad members
2nd Jatiya Sangsad members
3rd Jatiya Sangsad members
5th Jatiya Sangsad members
7th Jatiya Sangsad members
State Ministers of Land